Alois Moser (17 June 1930 – 1 January 2013) was a Canadian ski jumper who competed in the 1960 Winter Olympics.

References

1930 births
2013 deaths
Canadian male ski jumpers
Olympic ski jumpers of Canada
Ski jumpers at the 1960 Winter Olympics